Helix School is a public high school in Helix, Oregon, United States.

Academics
In 2008, 91% of the school's seniors received a high school diploma. Of 11 students, 10 graduated, none dropped out, and one was still in high school the following year.

References

High schools in Umatilla County, Oregon
Public middle schools in Oregon
Public elementary schools in Oregon
Public high schools in Oregon